, born , was an early Japanese Marxist political activist and journalist, one of the original members of the American Communist Party and co-founder, in 1922, of the Japanese Communist Party. After 1884, he spent most of his life abroad, especially in the United States and the Soviet Union, where he was very active in the international socialist community, and after 1920, the communist community. Katayama had a weak base inside Japan, and was little known there. However, in the rest of the world, he was widely hailed as a leading spokesman for the Japanese socialist and communist movements.

Early life and education
Sugataro Yabuki was the second son born to Kunizo and Kichi Yabuki in 1859 in the Hadeki district of what would later become Japan's Okayama Prefecture. He was adopted by the Katayama family at nineteen and adopted the name Sen Katayama, becoming the Katayama's "first son", after his birth mother was deserted by her husband. The adoption avoided Katayama's conscription and allowed him to continue his education. In his autobiography , Katayama admitted that he was fortunate not to have been the first born in his birth family, as it saved him from some of the responsibilities that burdened some of his acquaintances.

Iwasaki's departure for Yale University inspired Katayama to work his way to the United States. Katayama attended Grinnell College, from which he graduated in 1892, proceeding to the Andover Theological Seminary and then to Yale Divinity School. During this period Katayama became a Christian and a socialist. Before attending Grinnell, Katayama attended Maryville College in Maryville, Tennessee.

Career
He returned to America in 1903 at the urging of Iwasaki to look into rice-farming opportunities. During this trip he attended the Second International Socialist Congress in Amsterdam where he gained recognition for shaking hands with the Russian delegate, G. V. Plekhanov, in a gesture of amity between the Russian and Japanese peoples, despite the then-ongoing Russo-Japanese War.  

In 1904 he attended an American Socialist Party convention in Chicago. He settled in Texas and his main business became rice farming.  =When his crop failed he became employed by a Japanese restaurant owner in Houston, Tsunekichi Okasaki, who bought  of land in Texas with the plan that Katayama farm it. In late 1905, the two borrowed $100,000 from Iwasaki to fund the rice harvest, together forming a "Nippon Kono Kabushiki Kaisha" (Japan Farming Company) to develop the project, making Katayama managing director. However, the company quickly dissolved, reputedly over Katayama's socialist leanings, and he returned to Japan in 1907, rejoined the socialist movement, and pursued a career in journalism.

He was arrested and jailed for his participation in the Tokyo Streetcar Strike of 1912, and after his release he left for California. Attracted by the success of the Bolshevik Revolution of 1917–1918, Katayama became an active communist and an officer for the Communist International. He travelled to Mexico and later to Moscow, where he was hailed as a leader of the Japanese communist movement. He remained in the Soviet Union until his death on November 5, 1933, and his ashes buried in the Kremlin Wall Necropolis in Red Square.

Personal life
Katayama had two children by his first wife, Fude, who died in 1903, and another daughter by his second wife, Hari Tama, whom he married in 1907.

Works
 The Labor Movement in Japan. Chicago: Charles H. Kerr & Co., 1918.
 Japan and Soviet Russia, The People's Russian Information Bureau, 1919.

See also
 Shinkigen

References

Further reading
 Kublin, Hyman;  Asian Revolutionary: The Life of Sen Katayama, (Princeton University Press, 1964).
 Orii, Kazuhiko and Conroy, Hilary; "Japanese Socialist in Texas: Sen Katayama, 1904–1907", Amerasia Journal 8 (1981). 
 Handbook of Texas Short Biography
 Sawada, Mitziko; Tokyo Life, New York Dreams: Urban Japanese Visions of America, 1890–1924, (University of California Press, 1996) chapter

External links
 Sen Katayama Archive at Marxists Internet Archive

1859 births
1933 deaths
Japanese emigrants to the United States
Stalinism
Anti-revisionists
Japanese revolutionaries
American communists
American human rights activists
American Marxists
Christian communists
Maryville College alumni
Yale Divinity School alumni
Executive Committee of the Communist International
Grinnell College alumni
Japanese expatriates in the Soviet Union
Japanese expatriates in the United States
Japanese-American civil rights activists
Japanese adoptees
Japanese Christian socialists
Japanese journalists
Illinois socialists
Iowa socialists
Massachusetts socialists
Texas socialists
American male journalists
American journalists of Asian descent
American writers of Japanese descent
Marxist journalists
Burials at the Kremlin Wall Necropolis
Japanese Communist Party politicians
People from Okayama Prefecture
People granted political asylum in the Soviet Union
Meiji socialists